Fazekas & Butters is a television production company founded on October 4, 2005 by Michele Fazekas and Tara Butters.

History 
The company was established on October 4, 2005, when Michele Fazekas and Tara Butters left the long-running television series Law & Order: Special Victims Unit to sign an overall deal with Touchstone Television. Their first production, Reaper, aired on The CW from 2007 to 2009.

In 2009, the duo moved to 20th Century Fox Television, but the partnership was terminated in 2011. A subsequent partnership with CBS Television Studios was also short-lived. Neither of these resulted in any published material.

In 2013, they signed a deal with ABC Studios, working first on Agent Carter (2015–2016), then creating Kevin (Probably) Saves the World (2017–2018) and  Emergence (2019–2020).

Productions

References

External links 

 Fazekas & Butters at IMDb

Television production companies of the United States
Entertainment companies established in 2005
Entertainment companies based in California
2005 establishments in California
Companies based in Los Angeles